Hugh Anderson is the name of:

 Hugh Anderson (cowboy) (1851–1873 or 1914), gunfighter who participated in the infamous gunfight at Hide Park
 Hugh Alan Anderson (1933–2015), former Canadian politician
 Hugh Anderson (motorcyclist) (born 1936), former Grand Prix motorcycle racing World Champion from New Zealand
 Hugh J. Anderson (1801–1881), United States politician
 Hugh Anderson (Unionist politician) (1867–1933), Irish Unionist politician
 Hugh Abercrombie Anderson (1890–1965), Canadian writer
 Hugh Kerr Anderson (1865–1928), British physiologist and educator
 Hugh Anderson (theologian) (1920–2003), Scottish theologian